County Road 150 or County Route 150 may refer to:
County Road 150 (Hamilton County, Florida), formerly State Road 150
County Road 150 (Madison County, Florida), also formerly State Road 150
County Road 150 (Pinellas County, Florida)
County Road 150 (Hennepin County, Minnesota)
County Route 150 (Cortland County, New York)
County Route 150 (Fulton County, New York)
County Route 150 (Onondaga County, New York)
County Route 150 (Westchester County, New York)